Denis Donkervoort (born January 13, 1988) is a Dutch racing driver and the son of Joop Donkervoort, the founder of Dutch sports car manufacturer Donkervoort.

In January 2021, Joop Donkervoort announced his resignation from the company, giving his son Denis ownership of the company as Chairman.

References

Living people
1988 births
Dutch racing drivers
GT4 European Series drivers